Sixteen male athletes from Greece competed at the 1996 Summer Paralympics in Atlanta, United States.

Medalists

See also
Greece at the Paralympics
Greece at the 1996 Summer Olympics

References

External links
 Hellenic Paralympic Committee 
 

Nations at the 1996 Summer Paralympics
1996
Summer Paralympics